American Pie is a 1999 American coming-of-age teen sex comedy film directed and co-produced by Paul Weitz (in his directorial debut) and written by Adam Herz. It is the first film in the American Pie theatrical series and stars an ensemble cast that includes Jason Biggs, Chris Klein, Alyson Hannigan, Natasha Lyonne, Thomas Ian Nicholas, Tara Reid, Mena Suvari, Eddie Kaye Thomas, Seann William Scott, Eugene Levy, Shannon Elizabeth and Jennifer Coolidge. The plot centers on five classmates (Jim, Kevin, Oz, Finch, and Stifler) who attend East Great Falls High. With the sole exception of Stifler, who has already lost his virginity, the youths make a pact to lose their virginity before their high school graduation.

The title refers to a scene in which the protagonist is caught masturbating with a pie after being told that third base feels like "warm apple pie". Writer Adam Herz has stated that the title also refers to the quest of losing one's virginity in high school, which is as "American as apple pie."

The film was a box-office hit and spawned three direct sequels: American Pie 2 (2001), American Wedding (2003), and American Reunion (2012). In August 2017, Seann William Scott said in an interview that the fourth film probably had not made enough at the domestic box office to warrant another film. In addition to the primary American Pie saga, there are five direct-to-DVD spin-off films bearing the title American Pie Presents: Band Camp (2005), The Naked Mile (2006), Beta House (2007), The Book of Love (2009), and Girls' Rules (2020).

Plot

The story centers on five high school seniors and friends from fictional East Great Falls, Michigan: Jim Levenstein, an awkward and sexually naïve nerd whose dad offers him pornography and awkward sexual advice; Chris "Oz" Ostreicher, overconfident star of the lacrosse team; Kevin Myers, the calm leader of the group seeking to lose his virginity with his girlfriend Vicky; Paul Finch, a mochaccino-drinking sophisticate; and Steven Stifler, a popular but raucous jock who often throws wild parties and is the only one of the five who is not a virgin. 

When dorky classmate Sherman “claims” that he lost his virginity at a party hosted by Stifler, Kevin prompts Oz, Finch, and Jim to join him in making a pact. They pledge that they will lose their virginity by high school graduation.

Vicky accuses Kevin of wanting her only for sex so he has to repair their relationship before senior prom, now the target day for the four. Kevin discovers an old book in the library that has been compiled by students giving sexual tips; he shares the information with his friends and gives Vicky cunnilingus after studying the book. Oz joins the school choir to find a girlfriend and learn about sensitivity. He soon gains the attention of choir girl Heather, who learns about Oz's reputation and breaks up with him. Jim pursues Nadia, a Czech foreign exchange student.

After Oz tells Jim that third base feels like "warm apple pie", his dad surprises him having sex with a freshly baked pie in the kitchen. At school, Nadia asks Jim to help her study, and Stifler persuades Jim to set up a webcam in his room so that they can all watch Nadia changing clothes after coming over to study following her ballet class. Watching, they see Nadia discover Jim's pornography collection and while sitting half-naked on his bed, she starts to masturbate to it. 

Jim is persuaded to return to join Nadia, unaware that the webcam link has been sent to everyone on the school list. He fails to cover the webcam and when he joins a willing Nadia he experiences premature ejaculation twice. Nadia's sponsors see the video and send her back home, leaving Jim dateless for the prom and the laughing stock of the school.

Jim, believing school band geek Michelle is unaware of the webcam incident, asks her to the prom. Finch pays Vicky's friend, Jessica, $200 to spread a rumor of his sexual prowess, hoping that it will increase his chances of success. Stifler is turned down by a girl because she wants Finch to ask her, so he spikes Finch's mochaccino with a laxative. Stifler directs Finch into the girls' bathroom where Finch has loud diarrhea. As he leaves, he is laughed at by Stifler and a crowd of students. Oz makes the decision to leave his lacrosse championship game to join Heather for a duet performance and they reconcile.

At prom, Sherman's virginity conquest is revealed to be a lie and he urinates in his pants in front of everyone in attendance. Jim becomes annoyed by Kevin's obsession to have them fulfill their pledge. At Stifler's post-prom party, after Kevin tells Vicky he loves her, they have sex in an upstairs bedroom, and afterwards she breaks up with him, saying they will drift apart when they go to different colleges. Oz confesses the pact to Heather and renounces it, and they share a romantic night together by the lake. 

Jim learns that Michelle accepted his offer because she saw the "Nadia incident" and thought he was a "sure thing". Michelle then has aggressive sex with Jim. Finch meets and propositions Stifler's mother and they have sex on the pool table. Stifler later walks in on them and faints. The morning after the prom, the group discuss their successful pledge while eating at their favorite restaurant. Honoring his newfound sensitivity, Oz does not divulge to his friends whether or not he and Heather had sex. The friends then toast to the "next step".

Later, Jim strips for Nadia via webcam. He is oblivious of his father's walking in, who then walks out of the room and starts dancing as he calls for his wife to join him.

Cast

Cameos
 Blink-182 make a cameo appearance as the band watching Jim and Nadia during their webcast, though drummer Travis Barker is incorrectly credited as former Blink-182 drummer "Scott Raynor". Also, when their song "Mutt" is credited, Barker's name is misspelled as "Travis Barkor". The parts were given when Tom DeLonge's acting agent reported the film needed a band.
 Casey Affleck as Tom Myers, Kevin's older brother.
 Stacy Fuson, Playmate of the Month for February 1999, appears in the crowd laughing at Finch when he exits the girls' restroom.

Production

Much of the film is based on the writer's days at East Grand Rapids High School in Michigan. In the film, the town is called "East Great Falls", and the high school bears the same school colors — blue and gold — along with a similar mascot — the Trailblazers instead of the Pioneers. The restaurant hangout, "Dog Years", is based on Yesterdog, a popular hot dog restaurant in the nearby Eastown neighborhood of Grand Rapids. The "Central Chicks" and "Central" Lacrosse team that East Great Falls plays against is an amalgam of nearby Forest Hills Central High School. The working title for the film had been "East Grand Rapids".

Adam Herz wrote the screenplay, tentatively titled Untitled Teenage Sex Comedy That Can Be Made For Under $10 Million That Most Readers Will Probably Hate But I Think You Will Love, in six weeks using Porky's and Bachelor Party as inspiration. Principal photography on the film, now titled Great Falls, begun on July 21 and wrapped on September 11, 1998. The film originally received an NC-17 rating from the Motion Picture Association of America until edits were made to secure an R rating. During the casting of the film, Bill Murray was considered for the role of Noah Levenstein, Jim's dad. Jonathan Taylor Thomas was considered for the role of Jim Levenstein. When Eugene Levy was cast, he insisted on being allowed to improvise his lines, as he disliked how his character was written in the script. In the final film, most of his lines were improvised.

The film was actually shot in Southern California, most notably in Long Beach using Long Beach Unified School District area high schools. Millikan High School, whose school colors are blue and gold, was used for exterior shots, and Long Beach Polytechnic High School was used for interior shots. Located in Los Cerritos, Long Beach, California, both schools are within five miles of the Virginia Country Club and Los Cerritos Neighborhood (where Ferris Bueller's Day Off and Donnie Darko were filmed).

Reception

Box office
Despite insiders claiming it to be a potential sleeper hit, Universal Pictures sold off the foreign rights in an attempt to recoup its budget. American Pie was sold successfully to foreign distributors at the Cannes International Film Festival. It earned $18.7 million during its opening weekend and defeated Wild Wild West to reach the number one spot. The film grossed $235,483,004 worldwide, $132,922,000 of which was from international tickets. In the United States and Canada, it grossed $102,561,004 and was the twentieth highest-grossing film of 1999. In Germany, distributed by Constantin Films, it was the most successful theatrical release of 2000 with a gross of $33.5 million.

In home video rentals, the film has grossed $109,577,352 worldwide, with $56,408,552 of that coming from sales in the US.

Critical response
On review aggregation website Rotten Tomatoes, American Pie has an approval rating of 61% based on 129 reviews, with an average rating of 5.80/10. The critical consensus reads, "So embarrassing it's believable, American Pie succeeds in bringing back the teen movie genre." On Metacritic, the film has a score of 58 out of 100 based on 30 critics, indicating "mixed or average reviews". Audiences surveyed by CinemaScore gave the film a grade of A− on a scale of A to F.

The more negative reviews include Stephen Holden of The New York Times who felt American Pie was "one of the shallowest and the most prurient teen films." Ernest Hardy of Film.com wrote that American Pie "had a few amusing bits, however the audience should strongly note that the movie is really awful, and that it was not worthy of guilty pleasure status." Jim Sullivan of The Boston Globe wrote that American Pie is a "gross and tasteless high school romp with sentimental mush." Roger Ebert was more supportive, awarding it three out of four stars. He noted that "[i]t is not inspired, but it's cheerful and hard-working and sometimes funny, and—here's the important thing—it's not mean. Its characters are sort of sweet and lovable."

Accolades

Home media 
American Pie was released on DVD and Blu-Ray in both rated and unrated versions.

Soundtrack
The film's soundtrack peaked at number 50 on the Billboard 200 chart.

The following songs were included in the film but were not featured on the soundtrack:
 Sex-o-rama Band – "Love Muscle" (plays in the beginning with Jim watching a porn video, and again with Jim having sex with a pie.)
 The Ventures – "Walk Don't Run" (Plays when Finch runs to the bathroom.)
 Barenaked Ladies – "One Week" (Plays twice in the film, once during one of the party scenes and during the end of the film where Jim's Dad watches Jim stripping at the webcam.)
 The Brian Jonestown Massacre – "Going To Hell" (Plays in the first Dog Years scene before Stifler's party.)
 Third Eye Blind – "Semi-Charmed Life" (Plays during the Dog Years scene after the party.)
 Oleander – "I Walk Alone" (Plays during one of the party scenes, Stifler opens the door for the band geeks and rejects them from the party.)
 Hole – "Celebrity Skin" (Plays when Kevin performs oral sex on Vicki)
 Everclear – "Everything to Everyone" (During a montage with Oz and Heather on the docks and Kevin and Vicki in the house.)
 Harvey Danger – "Flagpole Sitta" (Plays when Jim sets up his webcam.)
 Duke Daniels – "Following a Star" (During a montage with Jim buying a tuxedo and Vicki dancing in the mirror.)
 Simon & Garfunkel – "Mrs. Robinson" (Plays when Finch seduces Stifler's Mom.)
 Libra Presents Taylor – "Anomaly - Calling Your Name (Granny's Epicure Mix)" (Plays when Nadia is about to have sex with Jim.)
 Etta James – "At Last" (Plays when Jim walks over to Nadia in slow motion.)
 Five Easy Pieces: - “Turn It Around” (When Kevin asks his brother tips on how to give Vicky an orgasm.)
 Loni Rose – "I Never thought you would come" (When Oz and Heather kiss.)
 Norah Jones – "The Long Day is Over"
 Marvin Gaye – "How Sweet It Is (To Be Loved by You)"
 Maria Muldaur – "Midnight at the Oasis"
 Simple Minds – "Don't You (Forget About Me)"

Certifications

See also
 Superbad, a 2007 film with a similar premise.
 List of films featuring surveillance

References

External links

 
 
 
 
 

1999 films
1999 comedy films
1999 directorial debut films
1990s buddy comedy films
1990s coming-of-age comedy films
1990s high school films
1990s sex comedy films
1990s teen comedy films
American buddy comedy films
American coming-of-age comedy films
American high school films
American Pie (film series)
American sex comedy films
American teen comedy films
1990s English-language films
Films about proms
Films about virginity
Films directed by Chris Weitz
Films directed by Paul Weitz
Films set in Michigan
Films shot in California
Films with screenplays by Adam Herz
Newmarket films
Summit Entertainment films
Teen buddy films
Teen sex comedy films
Universal Pictures films
1990s American films